The 1953–54 National Football League was the 23rd staging of the National Football League (NFL), an annual Gaelic football tournament for the Gaelic Athletic Association county teams of Ireland.

Carlow reached their only final to date, and opened well, leading Mayo by 0-2 to 0-1 after ten minutes. But then the 'flying doctor' Pádraig Carney, who came home from America for the game, levelled before Tommy Langan punched a goal from a Carney centre in the 26th minute. Mayo's second goal from M. Flanagan in the 10th minute of the second-half ended Carlow's dreams of National League glory, and gave Mayo their ninth NFL win.

Format 
Teams are placed into Divisions I, II, III and IV. The top team in each division reaches the semi-finals.

Results

Division 
 won, ahead of Kerry, Cork, Wexford, Kildare, Waterford and Tipperary.

Division 
 won

Division III
 won, finishing ahead of Longford, Westmeath, Sligo, Leitrim, Meath and Cavan.

Division 
 won

Finals

References

National Football League
National Football League
National Football League (Ireland) seasons